is a 36 episode anime series aired from 1983 to 1984 in Japan and also aired in Hong Kong at roughly the same time. Other loosely translated names include "Dorvack", "Dolbuk", "Special Powered Armor Troop Dorvack", "Powered Armor Dorvack", "Special Machine Army Dorvack", "Machine Corps Dorvack", "Armored Trooper Dorvack", "Tokusou Kihei Dorvack", "Comando Dolbuck" (Brazil), and "Dolbuk, Defensores de la Tierra" (Latin America).

Story
The year is 1999. The Idelians, whose colony-ship has been wandering in space for tens of thousands of years, are nearing exhaustion. Their sole hope is to settle on the nearest habitable planet, Earth. Soon after their arrival in orbit, they launch an invasion, landing a large attack force in the Alps.

The Earth Defense Forces valiantly fight in their powered armor against the enemy, but with little success. Only one unit is able to inflict significant damage, the Special Armored Battalion Dorvack. Under the command of Colonel Takagi, Masato Mugen, Pierre Bonaparte and Louie Oberon fight to defeat the invaders. They are equipped with special variable mecha that are able to convert from rugged all-terrain vehicles to humanoid forms.

Concept
The show was essentially a showcase for the toyline released by Takatoku. The mecha designs were created by Katsumi Itabashi and Nobuyoshi Habara, while the models were made by the model company Gunze Sangyo. The plot was kept simple, but filled with high levels of animation and action.

Staff
 Planning, Production: Ashi Productions, Yomiuri
 Director: Masami Anno
 Story editor: Shigemitsu Taguchi
 Original creator: Takeshi Shudo
 Character Design: Osamu Kamijo
 Mecha design: Katsumi Itabashi, Nobuyoshi Habara

Music
 Opening Theme: "Chikyuu Ni I Love You" by WELCOME
 Ending Theme: "Kimi Ni Okuru Lullaby" by WELCOME

Voice cast

Merchandise
The series featured some solid mechanical designs, but the slow-moving storyline failed to move fans. The line of 1/24, 1/72 and 1/100 scale toys and models sat on Japanese toy store shelves. Toymaker Takatoku Toys, already suffering from the poor performances of the merchandise lines from the previous Super Dimension Century Orguss and Galactic Whirlwind Sasuraiger series, went under as a result.

American toy company Hasbro acquired the molds for two of the deluxe toys, the Mugen Calibur and the Ovelon Gazzette. They were re-released in North America as part of the Transformers line as "Deluxe Autobots", under the names "Roadbuster" and "Whirl", respectively. While both Roadbuster and Whirl featured heavily in British-written stories for Marvel UK's Transformers comics (even though, ironically, their toys were never released in the UK) neither character appeared in the American animated series or in U.S. Marvel stories. Due to their fame in the English stories, Dreamwave Productions made use of them in their Transformers comics, produced some 16–17 years later. They also had prominent roles in Transformers (IDW Publishing). Bonaparte Tulcas would later appear in a cameo role in the 'Fun Publication' run, getting the name "Headcannon".

The American firm Select also repackaged two color variations each of the smaller Variable Machine Collection toys under the name "Convertors". Mugen Calibur became "Wheels", Oberon Gazzette became "Chopper", and Bonaparte Tulcas became "Tanker".

References

External links
 
 Geneon DVD 
 Convertors section at Toy Archive
 Convertors section at Counter-x

1983 anime television series debuts
1983 Japanese television series debuts
1984 Japanese television series endings
Action anime and manga
Ashi Productions
Drama anime and manga
Real robot anime and manga
Television series set in 1999
Transforming toy robots